Hooked on You is a 2007 Hong Kong comedy-drama film directed and edited by Law Wing-Cheong and produced by Johnnie To and his production company Milkyway Image. Featuring an ensemble cast, the film stars Miriam Yeung as a fishmonger who strives to fulfill her lifelong dreams before she turns 30.

Plot
Miu, a fishmonger at the Prosperity Market. Because of her father's debt she gives herself three years to work at the Wet market. She promises herself that she's going to leave the wet market and find a man worthy of her. At the market she always quarrels with her neighbor stall Mr. Fish (Eason Chan), but when a new supermarket threatens their business at the Prosperity Market they work together to fight against it.

Cast
 Miriam Yeung - Miu
 Eason Chan - Fishman
 Huang Bo - Porky
 Fung Shui-Fan - Miu's father
 Stephanie Cheng
 Wong You-Nam - Joe
 Jo Kuk - Salesgirl at accessory shop
 Charmaine Fong
 Lam Ka-Tung - Beautician
 Hui Shiu-Hung - Bro Hung
 Raymond Wong - Man at bowling parlour
 Carl Ng - Miu's date
 Wayne Lai - Porky (voice)

See also
 Johnnie To filmography

External links
 
 Hooked on You at MTime.com
 HK Cinemagic entry
 
 

2007 films
Films directed by Law Wing-cheung
2000s Cantonese-language films
Media Asia films
Milkyway Image films
2007 romantic comedy-drama films
Hong Kong romantic comedy-drama films
2007 comedy films
2007 drama films
2000s Hong Kong films